At 4 O'Clock In The Summer, Hope, also known as About Four o'clock in the Summer, the Hope and At Four in the Summer, Hope, is a 1929 painting by French surrealist painter Yves Tanguy.

Description 

From the Masterworks series:

Author David Clarke noted that the painting is one of a number of canvases by Tanguy that has ambiguous underwater ambiance.

Influence 

At 4 O'Clock In The Summer, Hope was the subject of a short documentary film, which ran as the 190th episode of the British television series 100 Great Paintings.

Author Laurie Wilson has argued that the title of Alberto Giaccometti's 1932 sculpture Palais de Quartres Heures (which is most often translated as Palace at 4 A.M.), is derived from the title of Tanguy's painting since Tanguy had influenced other works by Giacometti and because they had been friends since early 1930, when Tanguy moved into the same studio complex as Giacometti.

References

Surrealist paintings
1929 paintings
Paintings by Yves Tanguy